Narbo is a former settlement in Madera County, California.

Narbo was a mining community financed by French investors. The name Narbo comes from Narbonne, the name of one of the investors. Narbo is the Latin name for the town Narbonne, France.  A post office operated at Narbo from 1884 to 1887.

References

Former settlements in Madera County, California
Former populated places in California